Wreckshop Records is an American independent record label based in Houston, Texas. Founded in 1997 by Derrick "D-Reck" Dixon, the label specializing in southern hip hop music. Artists such as Fat Pat, Big Moe, E.S.G., Pymp Tyte and Big Pokey have released records through Wreckshop.

Artists 
 A-3
 Big Moe, a member of Screwed Up Click
 Big Pokey, a member of Screwed Up Click
 Chicken Hawk, a member of Platinum Soul Productions
 D Gotti
 Dirty $
 Donald D, a member of Platinum Soul Productions
 D-Reck
 E.S.G., a member of Screwed Up Click
 Fat Pat, a member of Screwed Up Click
 Noke D, a member of Platinum Soul Productions
 Pymp Tyte, a hip hop duo composed of rappers Sean Pymp and Tyte Eyes 
 Ronnie Spencer
 Tyte Eyes
 Wreckshop Family/Wreckshop Wolfpack
 Producers
 Platinum Soul Productions, a hip hop production trio composed of Chicken Hawk, Donald D and Noke D

Discography

Filmography 
 The Dirty 3rd: The Movie (directed by Henry LeBlanc)
 The Dirty Third 2: Home Sweet Home
 Ghetto Dreams (directed by Lionz I)
 Mann! The Movie

References

External links 
 Official website
 Wreckshop Records at Discogs

American independent record labels
Record labels established in 1997
1997 establishments in Texas
Companies based in Houston
Gangsta rap record labels
Hip hop record labels
Capitol Records